Antimitrella fuscafasciata is a species of sea snail, a marine gastropod mollusk in the family Columbellidae, the dove snails.

Description
The shell grows to a length of 2.5 mm.

Distribution
This marine species occurs off the East Cape, South Africa.

References

 Kilburn R.N. & Marais J.P. (2010) Columbellidae. pp. 60–104, in: Marais A.P. & Seccombe A.D. (eds), Identification guide to the seashells of South Africa. Volume 1. Groenkloof: Centre for Molluscan Studies. 376 pp.

External links

Columbellidae
Gastropods described in 2009